Gertrude (also spelled Gertrud) is a female given name which is derived from Germanic roots that meant "spear" and "strength". "Trudy", originally a diminutive of "Gertrude," has developed into a name in its own right.

In German-speaking countries, Gertraud (pronounced Ger-trowt) is a familiar variation of the name.

"Gartred" is a rare variation (attested in Daphne du Maurier's novel The King's General, set in 17th-century Cornwall, England).

"Gertruda" is a rare variation used in the Soviet Union as an abbreviation of Geroy truda (the Hero of Labour).

People

A–D
Gertrude Abercrombie (1909–1977), American painter based in Chicago
Gertrud Adelborg (1853–1942), Swedish suffragist
Gertrud Ahlgren (1782–1874), Swedish folk healer
Gertrude Alderfer (1931–2018), American professional baseball player
Gertrude Ansell (1861–1932), British suffragette, animal rights activist and businesswoman
Gertrude Appleyard (1865–1917), British archer
Gertrude Aretz (1889–1838), German historian and publisher
Lillian Gertrud Asplund (1906–2006), American last survivor of the sinking of the RMS Titanic––
Gertrude Astor (1887–1977), American motion-picture character actress
Gertrude Atherton (1857–1948), American writer
Gertrud Bacher (born 1971), retired Italian heptathlete
Gertrude Bacon (1874–1948), aeronautical pioneer and writer with contributions in astronomy and botany
Gertrud Baer (1890–1981), one of the founders of the Women's International League for Peace and Freedom
Gertrude Bambrick (1897–1974), American silent-film actress
Gertrude Baniszewski (1929–1990), American murderer
Gertrud Bäumer (1873–1954), German politician and feminist
Gertrude Bell, (1868–1926), archaeologist and spy
Gertrude Barrows Bennett (1883–1948), American writer of fantasy and science fiction
Gertrude Berg (1894–1966), American actress and screenwriter
Gertrude Bernard (1906–1986), Mohawk woman and companion of Grey Owl
Gertrud Bing (1892–1964), German scholar and director of the Warburg Institute
Gertrude Blanch (1897–1996), American mathematician
Gertrude Bloede (1845–1905), American poet
Gertrude Blom (1901–1993), Swiss journalist, social anthropologist and documentary photographer
Gertrude Elizabeth Blood (1857–1911), Irish-born journalist, author, playwright, and editor
Gertrude Bonnin (1876–1938), Sioux writer, editor, musician, teacher and political activist
Gertrude Bryan (1888–1976), stage actress on Broadway
Gertrude Caton–Thompson (1888–1985), English archaeologist
Gertrude Chataway (1866–1951), child-friend of English author Lewis Carroll
Gertrude Claire (1852–1928), American stage and silent-film actress
Gertrude Colburn (1886–1968), American dancer and sculptor
Gertrude Cosgrove (1882–1962), wife of Sir Robert Cosgrove, twice elected as Premier of Tasmania
Gertrude Courtenay, Marchioness of Exeter (before 1504–1558), a lady at the court of Henry VIII of England
Gertrude Mary Cox (1900–1978), American statistician
Gertrude Crain (1911–1996), American publishing executive
Gertrude Crampton (1909–1996), American children's writer and teacher
Gertrude Denman, Baroness Denman (1884–1954), British women's rights activist
Gertrud Hedwig Anna Dohm (1855–1942), German actress
Gertrud Dorka (1893–1976), German archaeologist, prehistorian and museum director
Gertrude Dunn (1933–2004), American professional baseball player

E–N
Gertrude Ederle (1905–2003), American competitive swimmer
Gertrude B. Elion (1918–1999), American biochemist and pharmacologist
Gertrude Elles (1872–1960), British geologist known for her work on graptolites
Gertrude Falk (1925–2008), American physiologist
Gertrude Franklin (1858–1913), American singer and music educator
Gertrud Fridh (1921–1984), Swedish stage and film actress
Gertrude Gabl (1948–1976), Austrian alpine skier
Gertrude the Great (1256 – c. 1302), also known as Saint Gertrude of Helfta,  German Benedictine nun, mystic, and theologian
Gertrud Grunow (1870–1944), first woman teacher at the Bauhaus art school
Gertrud Hanna (1876–1944), German activist and politician
Gertrude Healy (1894–1984), Australian violinist, educator
Gertrude Himmelfarb (1922–2019), American historian
Gertrud von Hindenburg (1860–1921), German noblewoman and wife of Paul von Hindenburg
Gertrude Jekyll (1843–1932), British horticulturist, garden designer, artist, and writer
Gertraud Junge (1920–2002), Adolf Hitler's last private secretary

Gertrude Kleinová (1918–1976), Czech three-time table tennis world champion
Gertrud Koch (1924–2016), German resistance fighter
Gertrud Kolmar (1894–1943), German lyric poet and writer
Gertrud Kraus (1901–1977), Israeli pioneer of modern dance
Gertrude Kuh (1893–1977), American landscape architect 
Gertrude Lawrence (1898–1952), Gertrude Alexandra Dagmar Lawrence Klasen. English actress, singer, dancer and performer
Gertrude Rachel Levy (1884–1966), author and cultural historian
Gertrud Luckner (1900–1995), German Christian resister against Nazism
Gertrud Månsson (1866–1935), Swedish politician, the first woman in the Stockholm city council
Gertrud Elisabeth Mara (1749–1833), German operatic soprano
Frances Gertrude McGill  (1882–1959), pioneering Canadian forensic pathologist and criminologist
Sarah Gertrude Millin (1889–1968), South African author
Gertrude Mongella (born 1945), Tanzanian politician
Gertrude Morgan (1900–1980), African-American artist, musician, poet and preacher
Gertrude Comfort Morrow (ca. 1888–1983), American architect 
Gertrude Neumark (1927–2010), American physicist
Gertrude of Nivelles (c. 628–659),  seventh-century abbess, co-founder of the Abbey of Nivelles located in present-day Belgium

O–Z
Gertrud Otto (1895–1970), German art historian
Gertrude Clare Owens (1887–1963), Superior General of the Sisters of Providence of Saint Mary-of-the-Woods, Indiana
Gertrud Pätsch (1910–1994), German ethnologist and philologist
Gertrud Pålson-Wettergren (1897–1991), Swedish mezzo-soprano
Gertrude Penhall (1846–1929), American civic leader and clubwoman
Gertrude Pridgett Rainey (1882–1939), better known as Ma Rainey, blues singer
Gertrud von Puttkamer (1881–1944), German erotic writer
Gertrud Rask (1673–1735), first wife of the Danish-Norwegian missionary to Greenland, Hans Egede
Gertrud Rittmann (1908–2005), German composer and music arranger in the United States
Gertrude Sawyer (1895–1996), American architect
Gertrude Scharff Goldhaber (1911–1998), German-born Jewish-American nuclear physicist
Gertrud Schoenberg (1898–1967), second wife of Austrian composer Arnold Schoenberg
Gertrud Scholtz-Klink (1902–1999), fervent Nazi Party (NSDAP) member in Nazi Germany
Gertrud Schüpbach (born 1950), Swiss-American molecular biologist
Gertrud Seidmann (1919–2013), Austrian-British linguist and jewelry historian
Gertrud Skomagers (died 1556), Danish alleged witch
Gertrúd Stefanek (born 1959), Hungarian Olympic fencer
Gertrude Stein (1874–1946), American novelist, poet, playwright, and art collector
Gertrude Story (1929–2014), Canadian writer and radio broadcaster
Gertrude Strohm (1843–1927), American author, compiler, game designer
Gertrud Szabolcsi (1923–1993), Hungarian biochemist
Gertrude Townend, British nurse and suffragette
Gertrude Unruh (1925–2021), German politician
Gertrude Vachon (1962–2010), better known as Luna Vachon, American professional wrestler
Gertrude Vaile (1878–1954), American social worker
Gertrude Chandler Warner (1890–1979), American children's author
Gertrude Vanderbilt Whitney (1875–1942), American sculptor, art patron and collector
Gertrude Walton Donahey (1908–2004), American politician
Gertrude Weil (1879–1971), American activist in women's suffrage, labor reform, and civil rights
Gertrud Wolle (1891–1952), German film actress

Fictional characters
Gertrud Barkhorn, from the anime/manga series Strike Witches
Gertrude Gadwall, a member of Disney's Duck family
Gertrude, from William Shakespeare's play Hamlet, is Hamlet's mother and Queen of Denmark

See also
 Gertrude (disambiguation), for a list of fictional characters and people known by only one name
 Gertrudis
 Geertruida

References

 German feminine given names
 English feminine given names